Ron Wright (October 26, 1938 – April 21, 2015) was an American professional wrestler, promoter and manager. He wrestled and managed primarily for territory promotions in the Southeastern United States from the 1950s until the 1990s, particularly in the Tennessee and Kentucky areas, including for National Wrestling Alliance, Southeast Championship Wrestling, Continental Wrestling Association, Continental Championship Wrestling, Mid-Atlantic Championship Wrestling and Smoky Mountain Wrestling.

Professional wrestling career
Ron Wright started wrestling in 1956 with his real life friend and future wrestling opponent Whitey Caldwell as well as his brother Don Wright, following an amateur start at the Kingsport Boys Club. Ron Wright and Caldwell soon caught the eye of Kingsport NWA promoter Mickey Baarnes as well as outlaw Buddy Russels for whom they made their debut on January 21, 1956. Both debuted as teenagers with a younger Ron Wright mostly working as a referee for Baarnes while the older Caldwell quickly made a name as a wrestler. Ron Wright gained a reputation for being a wrestling heel when in 1961 he seriously and legitimately injured Caldwell (putting him out of action for a year) who was by then a very popular wrestling babyface and television champion.

Ron Wright was the most hated heel in his territory (area where wrestling promoters and wrestlers operated) for almost three decades,  engaging in extremely physical, violent and bloody matches, mostly as part of a tag team and often with his brother Don Wright. His most well-known and frequent opponent was Caldwell who he would try to provoke to genuine anger in order to make their bouts better. He was known not only for being a nefarious cheat and bully but also for his speaking ability, both as a wrestler and as a manager, with a style based on local preachers. Despite mostly wrestling as a heel, he did however appear as a face in a tribute match for Whitey Caldwell after his friend's death at the hands of a drunk driver in 1972. 

By the end of the 1970s Ron Wright had mostly transitioned to an on-screen management role while becoming an off-screen secret owner of his local territory (the Kingsport, Bristol and Johnson City region in Tennessee, i.e. Tri-City area, part of the future Southeastern Championship Wrestling territory).

He suffered a serious injury at the beginning of the 80s and disappeared from wrestling as a wrestler, manager and promoter until 1987 when he came back as a manager in Continental Championship Wrestling, then USA Championship Wrestling, and later in Smoky Mountain Wrestling.

His ability to draw heat was so great that he was legitimately shot at three times by fans as well as being slashed with razor, resulting in a wound that requires 160 stitches. He also had his personal small plane burnt by persons unknown, possibly wrestling fans (Wright himself believed that the plane was burnt to cover up the theft of expensive parts). Wright noted, with regret, that he had caused four or five elderly spectators to have heart attacks over his antics.

Personal life
Ron Wright was married to Teresa Wright. He would race go-carts that he built as an avid mechanic, with his children. 
Ron Wright worked as a pressman alongside his wrestling career and during hiatuses. Despite making a substantial living as a wrestler, Ron kept his job to have benefits for his children in case of injury. He was well known for his charity work in Kingsport.

Professional wrestling persona
 Crusher (official ring name)
 Bonecrusher (nickname)
 Kingsport's Bad Boy (nickname)
 Backstreet Brawler (nickname)
 King of Kingsport and Number One Hillbilly (Smokey Mountain Wrestling nickname)

Notable opponents

Boris Malenko
Verne Gagne
Ron Fuller (wrestler)
Killer Kowalski
Blackjack Mulligan
Kevin Sullivan
Dory Funk Jr.
Whitey Caldwell
Danny Hodge
Ron Garvin
 Rocky Smith
 Louise Tillet
 Lester Welch
 The Assassins
Jim Cornette

Wrestlers managed

Mongolian Stomper
Phil Hickerson
Moondog Spot
Dennis Condrey
Jim Dalton
Dirty White Boy

Gimmicks
As an active wrestler, Ron Wright would use weapons including a custom-made knucklebuster with a blade to legitimately cut his opponents in the ring and cause them to bleed profusely. He called this his "chisel". Faced with a violent assault from Wright, a young scared rookie Kevin Sullivan in what he believed was actual self-defense tried to knock out Wright in the ring with a chain to which the veteran Wright replied with laughter and congratulations. He is also known for using a loaded boot, which wrestlers like Tony Anthony, The Grappler, Tom Prichard and Raven would use in later years.
 
As a manager, Ron Wright would pretend to have a heart condition and implore fans not to distress him with loud sounds which would lead them to making as much noise as possible, in the hope of causing him a heart attack.
 
In his later career as a manager, Ron Wright would constantly claim to have been a "scientific", "Christian" wrestler which would mean a face in 1980s wrestling terminology and claim never to have hurt an opponent despite being widely known to generations of audiences as one of the most violent, nefarious and cheating heels during his days as an active wrestler, especially in light of Whitely Caldwell's first and real injury.
 
As a manager in Continental Championship Wrestling, Wright would illegally interfere in matches handing heels weapons, distracting the referee or physically hindering or assaulting face opponents. Next as a manager in Smoky Mountain Wrestling (run by Jim Cornette), a still relatively young (in his mid fifties) Ron Wright would develop his character further and appear in a wheelchair claiming that he needed to find a wrestler (eventually mainly Dirty White Boy but with help from other heels) to manage, in order to make enough money for hip and heart operations, while still continuing his illegal ringside activities to the ire of commissioner Bob Armstrong, and heel manager Jim Cornette.

Championships and accomplishments
National Wrestling Alliance
NWA Hall of Fame (class of 2015)
NWA Mid-America
NWA Tennessee Tag Team Championship (21 times) – with Don Wright (14), Frank Morrell (2), Whitey Caldwell (1), Jack Donovan (2), Tommy Gilbert (1), & Nelson Royal (1)
NWA Southeastern Heavyweight Championship (5 times)
NWA Southern Junior Heavyweight Championship
NWA World Tag Team Championship (1 time) – with Don Wright
NWA Southern Heavyweight Championship (1 time)
NWA United States Tag Team Championship (1 time) – with Frank Morrell
NWA Southern Tag Team Championship
NWA Southern Junior Heavyweight Championship 

Southern Championship Wrestling
NWA Tennessee Brass Knuckles Championship (2 times)

Notes

Further reading
 

1938 births
2015 deaths
American male professional wrestlers
People from Kingsport, Tennessee
Professional wrestlers from Tennessee
Professional wrestling promoters
20th-century professional wrestlers